Here as in Heaven is the fifth live album from Elevation Worship. It was recorded live at Time Warner Cable Arena in Charlotte, North Carolina, United States with more than 16,000 in attendance. Essential Worship released the album on February 5, 2016.

Critical reception

Awarding the album four stars at Worship Leader, Bobby Gilles writes, "Elevation directs us to worship with a sense of wonder and purpose, as we celebrate the gospel and carry out our mission on earth." Mark Ryan, rating the album four stars by New Release Today, states, "Live worship is the best worship, and with Here as in Heaven, Elevation Worship gives the church new songs to enter into that secret place." Giving the album four stars from The Christian Beat, Herb Longs describes, "Filled to the brim, Here As In Heaven is a mixture of high-energy praise, thought-provoking worship, uplifting encouragement, and enthusiastic celebration of God’s work."

Awards and accolades 
The album was nominated for a 2016 GMA Dove Award for Worship Album of the Year.

The song "O Come to the Altar" was No. 3 on the Worship Leader's Top 20 Songs of 2016 list.

Track listing

Chart performance

Weekly charts

Year-end charts

Certifications

References

2016 live albums
Essential Records (Christian) albums
Elevation Worship albums